Stigmella paliurella is a moth of the family Nepticulidae. It is found in Italy, the Balkan Peninsula and Ukraine, east to the eastern part of the Palearctic realm. It is also present in the Near East.

There are at least two generations per year.

The larvae feed on Paliurus spina-christi. They mine the leaves of their host plant. The mine of the spring generation consists of a short, fairly broad corridor with a thick frass line. The mine of the summer generation is a long corridor with an extremely fine frass line.

External links
Fauna Europaea
bladmineerders.nl

Nepticulidae
Moths of Europe
Moths of Asia
Moths described in 1937